

U

V